Caula may refer to:

People
 Sigismondo Caula, Italian painter of the Baroque style
 Victor Hugo Caula, 20th century Argentinian cinematographer

Botany
Brun Fourca, red French wine grape variety that once grew widely throughout Provence and Southwest France
Counoise, a dark-skinned wine grape grown primarily in the Rhône valley region of France

See also 
 Kaula (disambiguation)